Maxim Stoyanov (born June 29, 1987) is a Russian stage and film actor, known for his work in the 2019 American comedy drama Give Me Liberty.

Biography
Stoyanov was born in Tighina, in the Moldavian Soviet Socialist Republic, USSR (now Bender, under the control of Transnistria, which is internationally recognized as part of Moldova) into the family of a train machinist and a factory worker. He studied at the Moscow Art Theatre School under Konstantin Raikin, graduating in 2013.

His first film role was in The Hope Factory, which premiered at the Rotterdam IFF.

Stoyanov garnered critical acclaim for his portrayal of Dima in Give Me Liberty. Justin Chang of The Los Angeles Times likened Stoyanov’s character to “a walking mascot for the movie’s big-heartedness; he may be the one character who, no matter how chaotic things get — and they get pretty chaotic — is delighted simply to be there.” “The movie's most big-hearted character is a Russian boxer named Dima played by Maxim Stoyanov with a boisterous charm that lights up his every scene.” Film Comment compared Stoyanov to a “muscle-bound young James Gandolfini”, whose character “has the eagerness of a large Alsatian puppy, and exudes the sort of undiluted force-of-nature comic charisma that filmmakers pray will miraculously fall out of the sky and into their cast.” Manohla Dargis of The New York Times placed “fantastic Max Stoyanov” in her 2020 list of Oscar-worthy performances.

In Russia, Stoyanov’s work in Give Me Liberty also received critical and public acclaim.
 
Stoyanov has also appeared in the Russian TV series Shifr by Vera Storozheva and The Missing by Vadim Perelman.

Selected filmography

Awards and nominations

References

External links
 

Russian male actors
Moscow Art Theatre School alumni
1987 births
Living people
People from Bender, Moldova